Mikael Norø Ingebrigtsen (born 21 July 1996) is a Norwegian footballer who plays as a winger for Odds BK.

Ingebrigtsen was born in Tromsø.

Career statistics

References

1996 births
Living people
Sportspeople from Tromsø
Norwegian footballers
Norway under-21 international footballers
Norwegian expatriate footballers
Association football midfielders
Tromsø IL players
IFK Göteborg players
Eliteserien players
Allsvenskan players
Expatriate footballers in Sweden

Association football forwards